Hammad Ali (born 11 September 1990) is a Pakistani first-class cricketer who played for Abbottabad cricket team.

References

External links
 

1990 births
Living people
Pakistani cricketers
Abbottabad cricketers
People from Swabi District